Semantic file systems are file systems used for information persistence which structure the data according to their semantics and intent, rather than the location as with current file systems. It allows the data to be addressed by their content (associative access). Traditional hierarchical file-systems tend to impose a burden, for example when a sub-directory layout is contradicting a user's perception of where files would be stored. Having a tag-based interface alleviates this hierarchy problem and enables users to query for data in an intuitive fashion.

Semantic file systems raise technical design challenges as indexes of words, tags or elementary signs of some sort have to be created and constantly updated, maintained and cached for performance to offer the desired random, multi-variate access to files in addition to the underlying, mostly traditional block-based filesystem.

See also
 Content-addressable storage
 Logic File System
 Semantic Web
 Tagsistant
 WinFS

References

External links
Research & Specifications
 Towards Semantic File System Interfaces, Proceedings of the International Semantic Web Conference 2008
 Semantic File Systems
 The Sile Model. A Semantic File System Infrastructure for the Desktop
 Semantic FS @ MIT Programming Systems Research Group
 Launchpad Blueprints: A tag-based filesystem for Ubuntu
 ReiserFS future vision
 external list of related work on semantic file systems @ semanticweb.org
 "Designing better file organization around tags, not hierarchies" detailed writeup by Nayuki

Implementations
 SemFS - A Semantic approach to File Systems, was TagFS
 Tagsistant - Tagsistant: semantic filesystem for Linux (Linux), see Wikipedia article Tagsistant
 TransparenTag - File system compatible with point'n'click and command-line interfaces
 tagxfs - A tag based user space file system extension
 Fuse::TagLayer - A read-only tag-filesystem overlay for hierarchical filesystems (Perl, Linux)
 xtagfs - XTagFS is a FUSE filesystem that organizes files/folders using 'Spotlight Comment' tags (Mac OS X)
 dhtfs - Tagging based filesystem, providing dynamic directory hierarchies based on tags associated with files (Python, Linux)
 TMSU - Tagged based filesystem for Linux. Provides a command-line tool for tagging and the ability to mount a virtual filesystem (using FUSE).
 dantalian - A multi-dimensionally hierarchical tag-based file organization system
 TagsForAll - Tagging based tool for windows that runs on top of the hierarchical filesystem
 Tag2Find - Tagging based tool for windows that runs on top of the hierarchical filesystem
 dhtfs - FUSE based tag-filesystem overlay for hierarchical filesystems (Perl, Linux)
 Elyse - tag-based file manager for mac & windows
 TagSpaces - tag base file browser for Windows, macOS, Linux and Android
 Tabbles - tag based document manager for windows

Semantic file systems